Andrei Alexandrovich Novoselov (born 24 November 1989) is a Russian pair skater. Competing for France with Lola Esbrat, he has won three international medals and is the 2018 French national champion. Earlier, he represented Russia with Tatiana Novik, Tatiana Danilova, and Sabina Imaikina.

Career for Russia 
Novoselov began learning to skate in 1993.

Partnership with Imaikina 
In 2007, Novoselov began competing on the ISU Junior Grand Prix (JGP) series with Sabina Imaikina. The following year, they won two silver medals on the JGP series and qualified for the 2008–09 JGP Final, where they placed 5th. At the 2009 Russian Championships, the pair placed fifth on the senior level and took bronze on the junior level. They were coached by Valeri Tiukov and Valentina Tiukova in Perm. They parted ways at the end of the season.

Partnership with Danilova 

Novoselov teamed up with Tatiana Danilova later in 2009. The pair was coached by Inna Utkina in Moscow. They placed 8th at the 2010 Russian Junior Championships and appeared on the ISU Junior Grand Prix series the following season, placing 4th in Austria and 6th in Germany. Competing on the senior level, they won the silver medal at the 2010 Golden Spin of Zagreb.

Danilova was unable to skate for a year following a shoulder operation so she told Novoselov that he could look for another partner.

Partnership with Novik 
In 2011, Novoselov began skating with Tatiana Novik. They placed fourth at the 2011 Ice Challenge and eighth at the 2012 Russian Championships before winning the 2012 Toruń Cup. The pair entered the 2013 Nebelhorn Trophy, intending to represent Romania, but did not compete at the event.

Novoselov also considered skating for Bulgaria and Kazakhstan.

Partnership with Stolbova 
On September 16, 2018, it was announced that Novoselov would compete in pairs with Ksenia Stolbova, who won gold and silver medals at the 2014 Sochi Winter Olympics.

Career for France 
By July 2014, Novoselov had teamed up with Daria Popova to represent France. They planned to divide their training between Moscow, coached by Inna Utkina, and Paris.

Russia released him to compete for France in exchange for French ice dancer Tiffany Zahorski. On 31 July 2015, however, it was announced that Popova had decided to retire from competitive figure skating.

Partnership with Esbrat 

Novoselov teamed up with France's Lola Esbrat in mid-2015. They are coached by Claude Thevenard in Paris and compete for France. In 2016, the pair won bronze medals at the Toruń Cup and Bavarian Open. In early April, they competed at the 2016 World Championships in Boston; they qualified to the free skate and finished 16th overall.

In the 2016–17 season, Esbrat/Novoselov won the silver medal at the NRW Trophy and placed 5th at the Toruń Cup. In January 2017, they placed 11th in the short program, 13th in the free skate, and 13th overall at the 2017 European Championships in Ostrava, Czech Republic.

On July 27, 2018, it was announced that Esbrat/Novoselov had split.

Programs

With Stolbova

With Esbrat

With Danilova

With Imaikina

Competitive highlights 
GP: Grand Prix; CS: Challenger Series; JGP: Junior Grand Prix

With Stolbova for Russia

With Esbrat for France

With Popova for France

With Novik for Russia

With Danilova for Russia

With Imaikina for Russia

References

External links 

 
 

1989 births
Russian male pair skaters
Living people
Sportspeople from Perm, Russia
Russian expatriates in France